Gary Evans Foster (November 6, 1894 – July 22, 1951) was a S.C. National Guard soldier serving in the United States Army during World War I who received the Medal of Honor for bravery.

Biography
Foster was born November 6, 1894, in Spartanburg, South Carolina and after enlisting in the United States Army was sent to France to fight in World War I.

After returning home from the war, Foster attended Clemson College.

He died July 22, 1951, and is buried in New Prospect Baptist Church Cemetery, Chesnee, South Carolina.

Medal of Honor citation
Rank and organization: Sergeant, U.S. Army, Company F, 118th Infantry, 30th Division. Place and date: Near Montbrehain, France, 8 October 1918. Entered service at: Inman, S.C. Birth: Spartanburg, S.C. G.O. No.: 16, W.D., 1919.

Citation:

When his company was held up by violent machinegun fire from a sunken road, Sgt. Foster with an officer went forward to attack the hostile machinegun nests. The officer was wounded, but Sgt. Foster continued on alone in the face of the heavy fire and by effective use of handgrenades and his pistol killed several of the enemy and captured 18.

See also

List of Medal of Honor recipients
List of Medal of Honor recipients for World War I

References
Specific

1894 births
1951 deaths
United States Army Medal of Honor recipients
United States Army personnel of World War I
Burials in South Carolina
People from Spartanburg, South Carolina
World War I recipients of the Medal of Honor
Military personnel from South Carolina
United States Army non-commissioned officers